The collect is a short general prayer in Christian liturgy.

Collect may also refer to:

Collecting, a hobby focused on acquiring items

See also
 Collect call, a telephone call paid for by the person called
 Collect Pond, New York, United States
 Collected (disambiguation)
 Collection (disambiguation)
 Collector (disambiguation)